Megacity is an iOS and Android video game developed by British studio ColePowered and released on August 2, 2011.

Gameplay
The game sees the player aim to construct a city and maintain it.

Reception

The game has a Metacritic rating of 86/100 based on 4 critic reviews.

AppGamer said, "The quality feel to the app and its addictive nature makes it an easy recommendation for anyone who likes puzzle games." 148Apps said, "One of those games that's always a pleasure to come back to. Whether or not everything's been unlocked, it's still going to make the hours melt away." AppSmile wrote "Featuring a building sim-style interface with pieces that interact with their surroundings, Megacity HD offers a cerebral challenge that rewards balanced play and thinking ahead." TouchArcade said, "All you really need to do is pay attention. In return, you'll find a satisfying puzzle experience that leaves you tantalized for one more shot at building the perfect city."

References

2011 video games
Android (operating system) games
IOS games
Puzzle video games
City-building games
Megacities in fiction
Video games developed in the United Kingdom